Extensible Forms Description Language (XFDL) is a high-level computer language that facilitates defining a form as a single, stand-alone object using elements and attributes from the Extensible Markup Language (XML). Technically, it is a class of XML originally specified in a World Wide Web Consortium (W3C) Note.  See Specifications below for links to the current versions of XFDL.  XFDL It offers precise control over form layout, permitting replacement of existing business/government forms with electronic documents in a human-readable, open standard.

In addition to precision layout control, XFDL provides multiple page capabilities, step-by-step guided user experiences, and digital signatures.  XFDL also provides a syntax for in-line mathematical and conditional expressions and data validation constraints as well as custom items, options, and external code functions.  Current versions of XFDL (see Specifications below) are capable of providing these interactive features via open standard markup languages including XForms, XPath, XML Schema and XML Signatures.

XFDL not only supports multiple digital signatures, but the signatures can apply to specific sections of a form and prevent changes to signed content.

These advantages to XFDL led large organizations such as the United States Army and Air Force to migrate to XFDL from using forms in other formats. Later, though, the lack of portable software capable of creating XFDL led them to investigate moving away from it. The Army migrated to Adobe fillable PDFs in 2014.

References

External links
Extensible Markup Language (XML) 1.0 (Fifth Edition), W3C Recommendation, 26 NOV 2008.
XML Coverpages
United States Army Publishing Directorate
USAF webpage with public downloadable XFDL reader: see "items of interest" link on right side of page for viewer download.
 See also XML Paper Specification (XPS)

Specifications
Extensible Forms Description Language (XFDL) 8.0
Extensible Forms Description Language (XFDL) 7.7
Extensible Forms Description Language (XFDL) 4.0

Editors
IBM Forms Designer
See XML editor for XML editors and other editing tools.

XML markup languages
Markup languages
World Wide Web Consortium standards
Technical communication
Computer file formats
Open formats
Data modeling languages